The 1935 Hardin–Simmons Cowboys football team was an American football team that represented Hardin–Simmons University during the 1935 college football season. In its first season under head coach Frank Kimbrough, the team compiled a 6–3–1 record, tied with New Mexico A&M in the 1936 Sun Bowl, and outscored all opponents by a total of 182 to 64.

Schedule

References

Hardin-Simmons
Hardin–Simmons Cowboys football seasons
Hardin-Simmons Cowboys football